19th Avenue and Randolph station is a light rail stop on the Muni Metro M Ocean View line, located in the Ingleside neighborhood of San Francisco, California. The stop opened with the line on October 6, 1925. The line was replaced with buses on August 6, 1939, but streetcar service resumed on December 17, 1944. The stop has no platforms, trains stop at marked poles before crossing Randolph Street and passengers cross a vehicle travel lanes on 19th Avenue to board trains. The stop is not accessible to people with disabilities.

The stop is also served by the  route which provides service along the M Ocean View line during the early morning when trains do not operate.

References

External links 
SFMTA – 19th Ave & Randolph St inbound and outbound
SFBay Transit (unofficial) – 19th Ave & Randolph St

Muni Metro stations